Ahmed Al Attas (born 28 September 1995) is an Emirati footballer who plays as a striker for Al Jazira.

International career

International goals
Scores and results list United Arab Emirates' goal tally first.

References

External links 
 

1995 births
Living people
Emirati footballers
United Arab Emirates international footballers
Association football forwards
Al Jazira Club players
Shabab Al-Ahli Club players
Al-Nasr SC (Dubai) players
Sharjah FC players
UAE Pro League players
Footballers at the 2018 Asian Games
Asian Games bronze medalists for the United Arab Emirates
Asian Games medalists in football
Medalists at the 2018 Asian Games